Sunset Highway may refer to:
Sunset Highway (Oregon), the westernmost portion of U.S. Highway 26 in Oregon
Sunset Highway (Washington), a.k.a. Primary State Highway 2